Xanthophyllum pachycarpon is a tree in the family Polygalaceae. The specific epithet  is from the Greek meaning "thick fruit", referring to the thick wall of the fruit.

Description
The smooth bark is greyish or dark green.

Distribution and habitat
Xanthophyllum pachycarpon is endemic to Borneo. Its habitat is mixed dipterocarp forests from sea-level to  altitude.

References

pachycarpon
Endemic flora of Borneo
Trees of Borneo
Plants described in 2005